Rashid Ali Abdallah (born 2 December 1959) is a Tanzanian CUF politician and Member of Parliament for Tumbe constituency since 2010.

References

Living people
1959 births
Civic United Front MPs
Tanzanian MPs 2010–2015
Fidel Castro Secondary School alumni
Mzumbe University alumni
Zanzibari politicians